is a Japanese middle-distance runner who specialises in the 800 metres. She was the 2012 Japanese Championships champion in the event.

Personal best

International competition

National title
Japanese Championships
800 m: 2012

References

External links

Ruriko Kubo at JAAF 
Ruriko Kubo at EDION girl track and field club 

1989 births
Living people
Japanese female middle-distance runners
Chiba
Athletes (track and field) at the 2010 Asian Games
Japan Championships in Athletics winners
Asian Games competitors for Japan